Sand Hill is an unincorporated community in Greene County, Mississippi, United States.

References

Unincorporated communities in Greene County, Mississippi
Unincorporated communities in Mississippi